The 2010 Toyota Racing Series was the sixth running of the Toyota Racing Series. The Toyota Racing Series is New Zealand's premier open-wheeler motorsport category. The Series included races for every major trophy in New Zealand circuit racing including the New Zealand Motor Cup and the Denny Hulme Memorial Trophy. The cars were also the category for the 2010 New Zealand Grand Prix, which was held as the third race of the Manfeild Autocourse round.

Teenager Mitch Evans claimed the title by just three points ahead of Earl Bamber, who won six races during the Series. Evans also claimed the International Trophy which consisted of the first four rounds of the championship.

Teams and drivers

Calendar

Championship standings

References

External links
Official website of the Toyota Racing Series

Toyota Racing Series
Toyota Racing Series
2010 in formula racing